The Dwarf is the translation by Bruce and Ju-Chan Fulton of a Korean linked-story novel, (lit. "A little ball launched by a dwarf"), written by Cho Se-hui and published in 1978. The Dwarf was a best-seller in Korea and was also made into a feature film  titled A Small Ball Shot by a Midget (1980) by director Lee Won-se.

Plot 
The Dwarf is a work of social criticism which focuses on the forced redevelopment of Hangbook-dong (행복동) in Seoul in the 1970s, and the human costs that accompanied it.

The Dwarf revolves around a literal “little guy,” and his family and friends, and their changing economic and social relationships which are destroyed by Korean modernization. The book follows the dwarf’s stunted existence through nasty cityscapes. A short cast of characters cycles in and out of the stories in anachronistic order.

The dwarf lives in the Felicity District in Eden Province. The District is chosen for redevelopment and the dwarf and his family are evicted. The dwarf eventually commits suicide in a factory smokestack while his family is sundered. Family members argue that society has misjudged the dwarf, by seeing his height and not his skills. This focus on literal measure is a subtle irony which references several aspects of modernization, including the necessities of measuring everything, regularizing the size of everything, and commodifying everything. At the time the novel was being written the Park government roamed the streets of Seoul, its fashion police literally measuring the hair-length of men and the skirt-length of women. In the factories, meanwhile, standardization, routinization and the tyranny of the time clock erased human differences between workers when not actually erasing humanity.

This scarring and diminution is not merely physical, it is social and economic as well. The dwarf dies, his son becomes a murderer, and the dwarf’s daughter is reduced to semi-prostitution to steal back her family's right to a home. This last theft fails; when the daughter returns to her home there is no sign of it ever having existed.

Short stories 

 The Möbius Strip
 Knifeblade
 Space Travel
 A Little Ball Launched by a Dwarf
 On the Footbridge
 Orbital Rotation
 City of Machines
 The Cost of Living for a Family of Ungang Laborers 
 The Fault Lies with God as Well 
 The Klein Bottle
 The Spinyfish Entering My Net
 Epilogue

Style

The Dwarf combines realism with a fantastic structure that places readers in the horrific and fragmented era the work describes. Cho mixes a kaleidoscopic narrative, powerful use of modern scientific symbols, and a flat and direct tone. The interlocking narrative arcs and often disconcerting internal shifts in narrator or time frame are both supportive of the theme of the book and ultimately rewarding.

The Dwarf was written between 1975 and 1978 as a series of loosely linked short stories published across several Korean magazines. In Korea these works were collected into A Dwarf Launches a Little Ball, which has been renamed The Dwarf for its English publication. The Dwarf is a yŏnjak sosŏl (linked novel) or collection of separately published short stories which can stand alone or supplement each other.

Characters 
 Father: A dwarf  of 3 feet 10 inches in “real life.”
 Mother: Like "Father", she is a poor labor worker.
 Youngsu (첫째 아들, 영수): the older son
 Youngho (둘째 아들, 영호): the younger son.
 Younghee (딸, 영희): the daughter.

Title
According to Reversion Korean Syntax, the proper title is not 'Nanjangi'(난장이), but rather 'nanjaengi'(난쟁이).

Influence 
The Dwarf was an extension of and addition to Korean Minjung Munhak Theory (민중 문학론). Some critics argued that the novel was just an example of paternalism aimed at the laboring classes.

Reflecting on the novel's tremendous success, Cho said in 2009, "I can't believe that novel has been read until the present."

References 

20th-century South Korean novels
2006 novels
Novels set in Seoul